Dehduwar is a village in Khutahan, Uttar Pradesh, India.

References

Villages in Azamgarh district